General elections were held in Liberia in 1891. In the presidential election, the result was a victory for Joseph James Cheeseman of the True Whig Party, who defeated former Secretary of War and Navy Anthony D. Williams, Jr., who ran on the New Republican Party ticket.

Cheeseman took office on 4 January 1892.

References

Liberia
1891 in Liberia
Elections in Liberia
One-party elections
Election and referendum articles with incomplete results